The 2009 CIS football season began on August 29, 2009, and concluded its campaign with the 45th Vanier Cup national championship on November 28 at PEPS stadium in Quebec City, Quebec. Twenty-seven universities across Canada compete in CIS football, the highest level of amateur play in Canadian football, under the auspices of Canadian Interuniversity Sport (CIS). The Queen's Golden Gaels defeated the Calgary Dinos 33-31 in the Vanier Cup to claim the 2009 national championship and their fourth in school history.

Schedule 
The regular-season schedule began early with a single Canada West Universities Athletic Association game in week one on Saturday, August 23, between the UBC Thunderbirds and the Simon Fraser Clan at Thunderbird Stadium in Greater Vancouver. The Ontario University Athletics, Quebec University Football League, and remaining CWUAA teams got underway the following week during the Labour Day weekend, and the Atlantic University Sport conference began their matches the week following that.

Awards and records

Awards 
 Hec Crighton Trophy – Erik Glavic, Calgary
 Presidents' Trophy – Cory Greenwood, Concordia
 Russ Jackson Award – Thomas Hall, Manitoba
 J. P. Metras Trophy – Matt Morencie, Windsor
 Peter Gorman Trophy – Linden Gaydosh, Calgary

All-Canadian Team 

 First Team 
Offence
 Erik Glavic, QB, Calgary
 Pascal Fils, RB, Sherbrooke
 Matt Walter, RB, Calgary
 Nathan Coehoorn, WR, Calgary
 Akeem Foster, WR, St. Francis Xavier
 Gary Ross, IR, Mount Allison
 Scott Valberg, IR, Queen's
 Matt Morencie, C, Windsor
 Matthew O'Donnell, OT, Queen's
 David Bouchard, OT, Laval
 Justin Glover, G, McMaster
 Pascal Baillargeon, G, Laval
Defence
 Jean-Philippe Gilbert, DT, Laval
 Gregory Alexandre, DT, Montreal
 Mathieu Brossard, DE, Montreal
 Osie Ukwuoma, DE, Queen's
 Cory Greenwood, LB, Corcordia
 John Surla, LB, Western Ontario
 Henoc Muamba, LB, St. Francis Xavier
 Anthony DesLauriers, FS, Simon Fraser
 Maxime Bérubé, HB, Laval
 James Savoie, HB, Guelph
 Olivier Turcotte-Létourneau, CB, Laval
 Jim Allin, CB, Queen's
Special Teams
 Hugh O'Neill, P, Alberta
 Perri Scarcelli, K, Regina
 Dillon Heap, RET, Wilfrid Laurier
 Second Team 
Offence
 Michael Faulds, QB, Western Ontario
 Nathan Riva, RB, Western Ontario
 Nick FitzGibbon, RB, Guelph
 Julian Feoli Gudino, WR, Laval
 Cyril Adjeitey, WR, Ottawa
 Anthony Parker, IR, Calgary
 Cory Watson, IR, Concordia
 Derek Weber, C, Saint Mary's
 Kristian Matte, OT, Concordia
 Kirby Fabien, OT, Calgary
 Terriss Paliwoda, G, Alberta
 Matthew Norman, G, Western Ontario
Defence
 Sébastien Tétreault, DT, Ottawa
 Eddie Steele, DT, Manitoba
 Craig Gerbrandt, DE, Alberta
 David Skillen, DE, St. Francis Xavier
 Andrea Bonaventura, LB, Calgary
 Tommy Lynch, LB, St. Francis Xavier
 Giancarlo Rapanaro, LB, Wilfrid Laurier
 Courtney Stephen, FS, Wilfrid Laurier
 Mike Miller, HB, Acadia
 Mark Holden, HB, Saint Mary's
 Grant Shaw, CB, Saskatchewan
 Dylan Hollohan, CB, St. Francis Xavier
Special Teams
 Christopher Milo, P, Laval
 Justin Palardy, K, Saint Mary's
 Gary Ross, RET, Mount Allison

Records
, three active CIS quarterbacks were climbing the top ten career passing records. Danny Brannagan of Queen's Golden Gaels was in fifth place for both all-time 9,236 career passing yards and 71 touchdowns. Michael Faulds of Western Mustangs was in sixth place just behind Brannagan with 9,137 career passing yards and Justin Dunk, of the Guelph Gryphons was seventh with 9,093 passing yards. In their rivalry game on October 17, 2009, both Brannagan and Faulds became only the second and third players, respectively, to pass for over 10,000 yards in their career. Faulds would eventually pass Brannagan and claim the title of All-Time Passing Leader, totaling 10,811 career yards, as well as the CIS single-season passing record with 3,033 yards. Brannagan would have to settle with second on the all-time list after a disappointing final game of the season left him with 10,714 for his career.

McGill wide receiver Charles-Antoine Sinotte was in eighth place on the career receptions list with 172 catches, and working towards reaching the record of 194 catches that former Redmen teammate Erik Galas set in the 2008 CIS football season.

Guelph kicker Rob Maver was in eighth place on the CIS all-time field goals list with 54.

Saskatchewan Huskies kicker Grant Shaw, kicked a 55-yard field goal on October 17 against Manitoba, to tie a Canada West record for longest field goal. It was two yards shy of the all-time CIS record of 57 yards.

Results

Regular season standings

Top 10

Ranks in italics are teams not ranked in the top 10 poll but received votes.
NR = Not Ranked, received no votes.

Championships 
The Vanier Cup is played between the champions of the Mitchell Bowl and the Uteck Bowl, the national semi-final games. In 2009, according to the rotating schedule, the Dunsmore Cup Quebec championship team will meet the Ontario conference's Yates Cup champion for the Mitchell Bowl. The winners of the Canada West conference Hardy Trophy travel to the Atlantic conference Loney Bowl champions for the Uteck Bowl.

The Canada West play-offs start with the top four placed teams from the regular season, with the top placed team hosting the fourth place and the second place team hosting the third placed. The winners of those semi-finals then compete for the Hardy Cup championship who then travels to the Atlantic champion for a national semi-final game.

The Quebec play-offs similarly play-off the top four placed teams with the Dunsmore Cup champions moving on to compete for the Mitchell Bowl against the Ontario champions.

The Ontario conference starts out with the top six placed teams from the regular season. The third placed team hosts the sixth place team and the fourth placed team host the team in fifth place. The winners then take on the top two placed teams in the conference semi-finals and the semi-final champions compete for the Yates Cup. The Ontario champions, in 2009, host the Quebec conference champions for the Mitchell Bowl national semi-final game.

The Atlantic conference play-offs the second and third placed teams to determine who plays the first place team at the Loney Bowl for the Jewett Trophy. The Atlantic winner then hosts the Canada West champion to meet in the Uteck Bowl national semi-final.

Playoff bracket

Notes

External links
 2009 Vanier Cup Media Kit

U Sports football seasons
CIS football season